Graham Ryan (28 August 1940 – 3 October 2010) was an  Australian rules footballer who played with North Melbourne in the Victorian Football League (VFL).

Notes

External links 

1940 births
2010 deaths
Australian rules footballers from Victoria (Australia)
North Melbourne Football Club players
Sturt Football Club players
Coburg Football Club players